Ke Jun (23 June 1917 – 8 August 2017) was a Chinese metallurgist who specialized in the formation of bainite. He was elected as an academician of the Chinese Academy of Sciences in 1980.
Born in 1917, Ke graduated from the Chemistry Department of Wuhan University in 1938. He gained his doctorate degree at University of Birmingham in Britain in 1948. He died in Beijing on 8 August 2017 at the age of 100.

References

1917 births
2017 deaths
Alumni of the University of Birmingham
Chemists from Jilin
Chinese centenarians
Chinese metallurgists
Educators from Jilin
Members of the Chinese Academy of Sciences
Men centenarians
People from Changchun
Academic staff of the University of Science and Technology Beijing
National Wuhan University alumni